In number theory, cousin primes are prime numbers that differ by four.  Compare this with twin primes, pairs of prime numbers that differ by two, and sexy primes, pairs of prime numbers that differ by six.

(3, 7), (7, 11), (13, 17), (19, 23), (37, 41), (43, 47), (67, 71), (79, 83), (97, 101), (103, 107), (109, 113), (127, 131), (163, 167), (193, 197), (223, 227), (229, 233), (277, 281), (307, 311), (313, 317), (349, 353), (379, 383), (397, 401), (439, 443), (457, 461), (463,467), (487, 491), (499, 503), (613, 617), (643, 647), (673, 677), (739, 743), (757, 761), (769, 773), (823, 827), (853, 857), (859, 863), (877, 881), (883, 887), (907, 911), (937, 941), (967, 971)

Properties 

The only prime belonging to two pairs of cousin primes is 7. One of the numbers  will always be divisible by 3, so  is the only case where all three are primes.

which has 20008 digits. In fact, this is part of a prime triple since  is also a twin prime (because  is also a proven prime).

, the largest-known pair of cousin primes was found by S. Batalov and has 51,934 digits. The primes are:

It follows from the first Hardy–Littlewood conjecture that cousin primes have the same asymptotic density as twin primes. An analogue of Brun's constant for twin primes can be defined for cousin primes, called Brun's constant for cousin primes, with the initial term (3, 7) omitted, by the convergent sum:

This constant should not be confused with Brun's constant for prime quadruplets, which is also denoted .

The Skewes number for cousin primes is 5206837.

Notes

References 
 
 
.
 

Classes of prime numbers
Unsolved problems in mathematics